Fragaria nilgerrensis is a species of wild strawberry native to southern and southeast Asia. Its fruit are white to light pink, with poor flavour, and the fruit is of no commercial value. It is similar in appearance to F. moupinensis.

All strawberries have a base haploid count of 7 chromosomes. Fragaria nilgerrensis is diploid, having 2 pairs of these chromosomes for a total of 14 chromosomes.

References

External links
 G.M. Darrow, The Strawberry: History, Breeding and Physiology.  Online version, chapter 8.
 

nilgerrensis
Plants described in 1857